Kampong Trabaek District is a district located in Prey Veng Province, in south eastern Cambodia. The district is bordered by Svay Rieng Province to the east, Vietnam to the south, Mesang District to the north and Prah Sdach District to the west.

Communes
Kampong Trabek District is divided into 13 communes, organized into 122 villages. The communes are:

 Ansaong (អន្សោង)
 Cham (ចាម)
 Cheang Dek (ជាងដែក)
 Chrey (ជ្រៃ)
 Kansaom Ak (កន្សោមអក)
 Kou Khchak (គួក ក្ចក)
 Kampong Trabaek (កំពង់ត្របែក)
 Peam Muntea (ពាមមន្ទារ)
 Prasat (ប្រាសាទ)
 Pratheat (ព្រះធាតុ)
 Prey Chhor (ព្រៃឈរ)
 Prey Pon (ព្រៃពោន)
 Thkov (ថ្កូវ)

References 

Districts of Prey Veng province